Dear Pyongyang is a documentary film by Zainichi Korean director Yang Yong-hi about her family. Shot in Osaka, Japan (Yang's hometown) and Pyongyang, North Korea, the film features Korean and Japanese dialogue with subtitles. The US release has Korean and Japanese dialogue with English subtitles. In August 2006, Yang released a book in Japanese under the same title expanding on the themes she explored in the film.

Story 
In the 1970s, Yang's father, an ardent communist and leader of the pro-North movement in Japan, sent his three sons from Japan to North Korea under a repatriation campaign sponsored by ethnic activist organisation and de facto North Korean embassy Chongryon. As the only daughter, Yang remained in Japan. However, as the economic situation in the North deteriorated, the brothers became increasingly dependent for survival on the care packages sent by their parents. The film shows Yang's visits to her brothers in Pyongyang, as well as conversations with her father about his ideological views and his regrets over breaking up his family.

Film festivals 
 Sundance Film Festival, 2006
 Pusan International Film Festival, 2006
 Berlin International Film Festival, 2006
 Hong Kong Asian Film Festival, 2021

References

External links 
 https://web.archive.org/web/20070331183426/http://www.film.cheon.jp/ 
 
 ’Dear Pyongyang’ builds bridge between life in N. Korea and outside world

2005 films
Japanese documentary films
 
2000s Korean-language films
2005 documentary films
Documentary films about North Korea
Films set in Japan
2000s Japanese films